The 1909 Chinese provincial elections were held to elect the members of the Provincial Assemblies (or Consultative Bureau) of China. The election was held between April and June 1909 in the 22 provinces of China as part of the New Policies as a move toward constitutional monarchy. The Provincial Assemblies were convened on 14 October 1909 and were responsible for electing half of the members of the imperial Advisory Council convened subsequently in 1910. These provincial assemblies survived even after the 1911 Xinhai Revolution that founded the Republic of China and replaced the Qing Empire. They were ordered to dissolve by the President Yuan Shikai.

About 1.7 million men, or 0.42 percent of a population of 410 million, were registered as eligible voters. It was marked as one of the most important episodes of Chinese democracy as "it [was] the first day in Chinese history that people can elect their representative," as promoted by newspaper Shi Pao, although a county council election in Tientsin had been held earlier in 1907. The Constitutionalists gained grounds in the election and became more active in the constitutional movement pushing for the establishment of constitutional monarchy.

Background

The Qing Empire in the early 20th century was undergoing a series of New Policies, including the proposal for a constitutional monarchy. In 1907, the Imperial Government promulgated the Constitutional Preparation Program that aimed to establish a National Assembly and 21 Provincial Assemblies on a provisional basis. In July 1908, the 115-clause "Regulations for Provincial Assembly Elections" was promulgated to lay out the property and education requirements for the candidates.

Electoral system
The minimum age of candidate in the elections were 30 years old and the minimum age of voter was 25. Middle-school education background and property worthy of 5,000 yuan were required for the electorate, while seventh rank for the civil office or fifth rank of military office, shengyuan level of Imperial Civil Examination degree and three year experience in public affairs or school administration were also required for candidate or electorate. Illiterate and women were excluded from standing or voting.

The elections adopted the double voting system which was borrowed from Japan, in which the preliminary voting was to choose the electors who cast the second ballot to elect the fixed number of assembly members.

Voter and membership statistics

Election results
The turnout of the election was only around 10 to 20 percent. Candidates in Northeastern China faced nearly no competition and was described as "handpicked" by the officials.

90 percent of the gentry who had a traditional civil examination degree, in which the examination system was abolished in 1905, were elected. The average age of the elected members was 40. The Constitutionalists campaigned for the election and they were divided into different small factions by background and political beliefs. Among those elected who later became famous were Zhang Jian in Jiangsu, Tan Yankai in Hunan and Tang Hualong in Hubei who were all elected speakers for their respective assemblies and leaders of the constitutional movement. Due to the double round system of voting which led to instances of bribery, corruption incidents were observed.

The elected member of the provincial assemblies elected the 98 members, consisting of half of the seats, in the imperial Advisory Council. As the Constitutionalists gained grounds in the assemblies, they began to form different political groups and further pushed for the implementation of constitutional monarchy.

See also
 Democracy in China
 Provinces of China
 1909 Chinese parliamentary election
 1912 Chinese National Assembly election

References

Provincial elections
1909 elections in Asia
1909
April 1909 events
June 1909 events